Hassan Zahran (Arabic:حسن زهران) (born 7 June 1985) is an Emirati footballer. He currently plays as  a defender.

External links

References

Emirati footballers
1985 births
Living people
Baniyas Club players
Al Dhafra FC players
Al-Wasl F.C. players
Ajman Club players
UAE First Division League players
UAE Pro League players
Association football defenders